Black Assassin or The Black Assassin may refer to:
 Bill Tabb, retired American professional wrestler
 David Hart Smith, Canadian professional wrestler
 Black Assassin (comics), a DC Comics character

See also
The Black Assassins